Clifford Douglas "Pop" Bliss (July 16, 1870 – March 26, 1948) was an American football player and coach.  He served as the head football coach at Stanford University, Haverford College, and the University of Missouri, compiling a career college football record of 15–6–1.  Bliss played football at Yale University as a halfback alongside his brother, Laurie Bliss, who went on to coach at the United States Military Academy and Lehigh University.

Playing career
Bliss was born in New York City and attended Yale University, where he played halfback.  With his brother, Laurie Bliss, in the same backfield, he led Yale to back-to-back national championships and undefeated seasons in 1891 and 1892.  Coached by Walter Camp, Yale did not allow opposing teams to score a single point in those two seasons.

Coaching career
In 1893, Bliss was named head football coach at Stanford University. Bliss, who had graduated from Yale the year before, was filling in for Walter Camp, who was the school's first coach in 1892 and returned in 1894. Bliss' team was undefeated with one tie.

In 1894, Bliss coached Haverford College but the team did not win a single game. In 1895, Bliss became the fifth head coach for the University of Missouri–Columbia Tigers located in Columbia, Missouri where his team record was 7–1.

Head coaching record

References

External links
 

1870 births
1948 deaths
19th-century players of American football
American football halfbacks
Haverford Fords football coaches
Missouri Tigers football coaches
Stanford Cardinal football coaches
Yale Bulldogs football players
Players of American football from New York City
Coaches of American football from New York (state)